Jesuit European Social Centre (JESC), formerly known as Catholic Office of Information and Initiative for Europe (OCIPE) is a research and documentation center on ethics and European integration founded in 1956.

History
In 1956, the Jesuits founded the "Catholic Office for Information on European Issues" (OCIPE) in Strasbourg. It was situated on Rue de la Toussaint in the city and its purpose has been to establish a research and documentation centre on European issues. Although centred in Strasbourg, it also had offices in Brussels, Budapest, and Warsaw.

In January 2012, OCIPE underwent a restructuring. Its office in Brussels was became the Jesuit European Social Centre (JESC). Its offices in Budapest and Warsaw became centres in their own right. Eventually, the office in Strasbourg also closed.

JESC continues the work of OCIPE as well as working with COMECE, CIDSE and the Chapel for Europe. In 2017, with help from the German Bishops' Conference, it began the European Leadership Programme. The programme was inspired by Pope Francis' speech 'Re-thinking Europe' and trains participants from all over the world over 5 months, in Brussels, while working for European organisations.

Bibliography
 Marc Feix, Diocesan Delegate for European Affairs, "The creation of OCIPE in Strasbourg," 14 December 2006 on the occasion of the celebration of the 50th anniversary of OCIPE.
 Henri Madelin, "Conference on the occasion of 50 years of OCIPE."
 Jean Schlick, "Civil Association and Association of Church problems of dual membership," Legal Praxis and Religion, 2, 1985, pp. 248–265.

See also

 Commission of the Bishops' Conferences of the European Community (COMECE)
 Ecojesuit
 List of Jesuit sites in Belgium

References

External links
 

Catholicism in Europe
Jesuit development centres
Organizations established in 1956
Research institutes in Belgium
Social science institutes
Cultural promotion organizations